Grete Sofia Havnesköld (born 10 March 1986) is a Swedish actress, most known for her role as Lotta in Lotta på Bråkmakargatan and Saga in Frostbite.

Selected filmography
1992–93 – Lotta på Bråkmakargatan
1997 – Selma & Johanna – en roadmovie
2006 – Frostbite
2010 – Prinsessa
2010 – Wallander – Dödsängeln

References

External links

Grete Havnesköld on Swedish Film Database

Swedish film actresses
Living people
1986 births